Ahmet Çakıryıldız (born 20 November 1911, date of death unknown) was a Turkish wrestler. He competed in the men's freestyle bantamweight at the 1936 Summer Olympics.

References

External links
 

1911 births
Year of death missing
Turkish male sport wrestlers
Olympic wrestlers of Turkey
Wrestlers at the 1936 Summer Olympics
Place of birth missing